Antique No. 1 may refer to:
 Antique No. 1 (1904 typeface), a typeface produced by Stephenson Blake
 Antique No. 1 (1906 typeface), a typeface produced by Inland Type Foundry